Big Talk is eponymously titled debut album by the American indie rock band Big Talk. It was produced by Joe Chiccarelli and Ronnie Vannucci, Jr. and released on July 19, 2011 through Epitaph Records.

Track listing

Critical reception

SPIN'''s William Goodman wrote "While Brandon Flowers has been largely credited with the Killers' infectious rock melodies and hooks, it now appears that the band's secret weapon was sitting behind the drum kit."  He continues that single "Getaways" is "an anthemic electro-rock jam with glistening synths and an upbeat, fun '80s feel, but in a way catchier (and better) way..."

The album was described by Digital Spy as the "rock club-shaped soundtrack to the summer".

David West of Rhythm Magazine'' wrote of tracks "Getaways" and "Replica" that "they rocked".  He cites "Sharp riffs, great vocals, and of course the driving power that gives The Killers their lethal edge," as reasons for his positive review.

Spinner's Theo Spielberg wrote, "Not straying far from the synth-rock brand of music the Killers peddle, Big Talk throws out epic hooks, anthemic riffs and '80s-style feel-goodery with effortless conviction. At times Vannucci sounds uncannily like bandmate Brandon Flowers. However, he also tries his hand at dirty Spaghetti Western tunes (see 'No Whiskey') as well as Wilco-ish alt-country rock ('Girls at Sunrise') with the same tangible delight of exploration he demonstrates simply by stepping out from behind the drums."

Simon Price of the British newspaper the Independent wrote, "It's much more fun than the Brandon Flowers album. Which, admittedly, isn't very big talk at all."

Accolades

Personnel
Ronnie Vannucci Jr – lead vocals, rhythm guitar, bass, keyboards, drums
Taylor Milne – lead guitar, backing vocals
Joe Chiccarelli – Producer

References

2011 debut albums
Big Talk albums
Epitaph Records albums
Albums produced by Joe Chiccarelli